The 2016 Alamo Bowl was an American college football bowl game played on January 2, 2016, at the Alamodome in San Antonio, Texas.  The 23rd edition of the Alamo Bowl featured the Oregon Ducks from the Pac-12 Conference and the TCU Horned Frogs from the Big 12 Conference. It was televised at 5:45 p.m. CST on ESPN and heard on ESPN Radio. It was one of the 2015–16 bowl games that concluded the 2015 FBS football season. The game was sponsored by the Valero Energy Corporation and was officially known as the Valero Alamo Bowl.

The Horned Frogs trailed 31-0 at halftime, but an injury to Oregon quarterback Vernon Adams Jr. just before the halftime break would result in a scoreless second half for the Ducks. TCU scored on all 9 possessions after halftime (6 in the second half and 3 in overtime), completing the comeback in the second half with a late field goal. The two teams traded touchdowns in the first overtime and field goals in the second. The Horned Frogs scored in the third extra period, failed their 2-point conversion, but held the Ducks out of the end zone. The 31-point comeback tied the largest comeback in NCAA college football bowl game history with the 2006 Insight Bowl.

Teams
Oregon from the Pac-12 Conference (9-3, 7-2 Pac-12) and TCU from the Big 12 Conference (10-2, 7-2 Big 12) were announced to play in this bowl game on December 6, 2015. They arrived on December 27 and 28.

Oregon

The 2015 season for the Oregon Ducks was a tale of two teams. A finger injury during the first game would keep Oregon quarterback Vernon Adams Jr. sidelined or completely ineffective for a month and by the time Adams returned to form the Ducks stood at 3-3. With a healthy Adams at the helm, the Oregon Ducks finished the season by winning their last 6 games, including a road win over Stanford, a division rival ranked #7 nationally.

TCU

Starting the 2015 season by winning 8 straight games, the TCU Horned Frogs finished the season by winning 2 of their last 4 games, including a 28–21 double overtime victory over rival Baylor.

The Frogs were playing the bowl game without two key offensive starters. Wide receiver Josh Doctson, a first-team All-American this season, did not play in the Frogs' final two regular-season games due to a wrist injury that required surgery, and was ultimately ruled out of the bowl game. Quarterback Trevone Boykin was suspended from the team for a violation of team rules; according to multiple media reports, he had been involved in a bar fight in San Antonio early in the morning of December 31, and was alleged to have swung at multiple police officers and struck one. Boykin faced several criminal charges in the wake of the incident, the most serious being a felony charge of assaulting a public servant. The suspension caused a dramatic change in the Las Vegas betting line, with TCU going from a 1-point favorite to a 7-point underdog.

After Boykin's suspension, Patterson turned to Bram Kohlhausen, a fifth-year senior walk-on, to start at quarterback. As a high school senior in 2010, he had been rated by ESPN above both Boykin and future Heisman Trophy winner and NFL player Johnny Manziel, and he started his college career at Houston, redshirting in 2011. After seeing little playing time in 2012, he went to the junior college ranks, playing the 2013 season at Los Angeles Harbor College in California and then walking on at TCU. This game would be Kohlhausen's first and only career start at the FBS level.

Game summary

Scoring summary

Source:

Statistics

Aftermath 
Two days after the game, Oregon coach Mark Helfrich demoted defensive coordinator Don Pellum to linebackers coach. Pellum, a former Ducks linebacker who had been involved with the program for more than 30 years as a player, administrator, and coach, had been criticized for the shortcomings of Oregon's defense in 2015. The Ducks finished the season ranked 93rd or worse (among 128 FBS teams) in eight defensive categories, and had set a school record for most points allowed per game at 37.5. The Ducks also lost outside linebackers coach Erik Chinander, who accepted the defensive coordinator position at UCF.

Shortly after Kohlhausen was named offensive MVP for the game, he found out that TCU had begun the process of placing him on scholarship for his final semester in spring 2016.

See also 
Houston Oilers at Buffalo Bills, 1993 Wildcard Playoff – Bills come back from a 35–3 third-quarter deficit to win in overtime. Known in NFL lore as "The Comeback". Largest comeback in NFL playoff history.
Monday Night Miracle – The New York Jets, trailing the Miami Dolphins 30–7 entering the fourth quarter, tie the game at 30 and 37 in that quarter, winning in overtime
2006 Michigan State vs. Northwestern football game – a 35-point comeback. Largest comeback in college football history (regular season or bowl game).
2006 Insight Bowl – the only other comeback from a 31-point deficit in any bowl game
Choke at Doak - Florida State comes back from 31-3 deficit in fourth quarter to tie the game with the Florida Gators, 31-31, before the inception of overtime in Division I-A College Football
Super Bowl LI- Patriots rally from 28-3 deficit to win 34-28 in overtime. As such, the game is commonly referred to as "28-3" due to the Falcons choke. 
2015 Armed Forces Bowl (January)- Houston rallies from 31-6 deficit with 11 minutes remaining in 4th quarter to beat Pittsburgh 35-34. This remains the largest 4th quarter comeback in college football bowl history.
2022 Indianapolis Colts-Minnesota Vikings game- Vikings rally from 33-0 down at halftime to win 39-36 in overtime. This surpassed The Comeback as the largest comeback in NFL history.

References

2015–16 NCAA football bowl games
2016,01
2016 Alamo Bowl
2016 Alamo Bowl
2016 in sports in Texas
January 2016 sports events in the United States